Friedrich August Wilhelm Baumfelder (28 May 1836 – 8 September 1916 in Dresden) was a German composer of classical music, conductor, and pianist. He started in the Leipzig Conservatory, and went on to become a well-known composer of his time. His many works were mostly solo salon music, but also included symphonies, piano concertos, operas, and choral works. Though many publishers published his work, they have since fallen into obscurity.

Life and Family
Friedrich Baumfelder was the third of seven children. His father was Carl Friedrich Gotthelf Baumfelder (1798–1865), a school reformer and pedagogue, and his mother was Friederike Ernestine (1806–1882).

At an early age, Baumfelder was admitted to the Leipzig Conservatory where he studied with Ignaz Moscheles and Moritz Hauptmann and later obtained a scholarship. His other teachers included Johann Schneider and Julius Otto. After leaving the Leipzig Conservatory, Baumfelder returned to Dresden where he worked as a cantor and music and piano teacher at the Dreikönigskirche. He taught Georg Schumann, who became one of his most successful students. In 1875, he became director of the Robert Schumann Singakademie, a post he held for several decades. Eventually, he became a successful and well known teacher and composer.

As Baumfelder gained recognition, he often went abroad to England, France, and later, the United States to perform. He and his wife Emma Baumfelder (née Skrimshire) had had five sons and two daughters: Henry (1864–1900), Fritz (1867–1888) (who composed as well), Florence (1869–1954), William (nickname Willie) (1870–1901), Gustav Baumfelder (1870–1931), Selma Marie Elisabeth (1871–1949), and Herbert Alfred Maria (1872–1946),

Legacy
A tribute to Baumfelder was published on May 27, 1936 in the Dresdner Gazette, a day before the hundredth anniversary of his birth. It said:

It's been 100 years since Friedrich Baumfelder was born, on May 28th. In Dresden, many people will remember him as the old tall figure with the white, flowing hair under his hat...

It goes on to mention that Baumfelder had written several oratorios, and a setting of the 40th Psalm. These works have since been lost and possibly destroyed during World War II. The article also talks about how the Dresdner Liedertafel praised him, since he was under its leadership for two years:

The [Dresdner] Liedertafel biography of him [Friedrich Baumfelder] says that he was zealous and always prepared, and conducted with the most charming skills (...) A memorial for the former musical leader of the Dresden Liedertafel will be...at the Trinity Cemetery...

Baumfelder is still known in the United States, Germany, and in Great Britain today, but only for a few of his works, mentioned below.

Musical works
Baumfelder composed more than 400 works, including symphonies, overtures, piano concerti, operas, choral works, and solo piano music. His Confidence, Op. 48 (lost), Rondo Mignon, Op. 49, Kinderscenen, Op. 270, and Rococo, Op. 367, were among his most popular works, and his Tirocinium musicae, Op. 300 was greatly demanded.

A great number of his works are lost, having been destroyed in World War II, and only a part of his oeuvre survives today.

His most known compositions today are the Peasant Dance from Op.208 and the Melody in F major (opus unknown or not assigned), which are played by students studying piano. More recordings of his works recently surfaced on CD by the Sächsische Posaunenmission, including his motet Praise the Lord.

List of works with Opus numbers

This list of compositions by Friedrich August Wilhelm Baumfelder is categorized in the following way:
Opus: The opus number of the work(s) (if any).
Composition: The work title.
Date: The date the work was published, performed, composed, or copyrighted; whichever was earliest.
Key: The key of the work(s).
Instrument(s): The instrument(s) or force(s) used to play this work.
Notes: More information about the work(s).

The date shown is the earliest publication or copyrighted (if not date performed or composed) of the work that are known of. Any of these works could have been published or copyrighted at an earlier date.

List of works without Opus number

Even though these works are thought to be without opus number, a lot of the works below may have originally been assigned to an opus number.

Sources
Only a list of sources was given for some of the biographical information given to create this article. The information came from the article at German Wikipedia.
 Paul - Hand Dictionary of Music, Leipzig, 1870
 Musicians Encyclopedia, Frank Altmann, 1936
 Dresden Gazette dated May 27, 1936
 Research by Freital Claus Scharschuch, on Friedrich Baumfelder's family history
 Pazdirek - Universal Manual of Music Literature

Inline citations

External links
 
 The Friedrich Baumfelder article at German Wikipedia
 The Carl Friedrich Gotthelf Baumfelder article at German Wikipedia

1836 births
1916 deaths
19th-century classical composers
19th-century classical pianists
19th-century German composers
19th-century conductors (music)
20th-century classical composers
20th-century classical pianists
20th-century German male classical pianists
20th-century German conductors (music)
20th-century German composers
20th-century German male musicians
German classical pianists
German male classical composers
German male classical pianists
German male conductors (music)
German music educators
German opera composers
German Romantic composers
Male opera composers
Musicians from Dresden
University of Music and Theatre Leipzig alumni